AYCE may refer to:
 Access Yea Community Education Program, an alternative high school program in Victoria, Australia
 All-you-can-eat restaurant, where a fixed price is paid for an unlimited amount of food